Spirit Wind is an album by multi-instrumentalist David Arkenstone, released in 1997. Most of the music was written for a film called Legend of the Spirit Dog. A Native American feel is present on several tracks.

Track listing
All tracks composed by David Arkenstone:
"The Ancient Road" – 4:21
"Destiny" – 2:42
"Companions" – 3:34
"Magic" – 1:44
"Night Visions" – 3:37
"Continue to Be" – 3:27
"The Wolf Hunt" – 1:29
"Northern Song" – 4:01
"Wind in the Trees" – 3:11
"A Special Place" – 2:35
"River Crossing" – 3:46
"Legends" – 2:36
"Changes" – 2:33
"Spirit Wind" – 4:59
"The Long Way Home" – 6:50

Personnel
 David Arkenstone – guitars, piano, mandolin, cittern, percussion, bass, flute, keyboards, sound design
 Don Markese – Watershed flutes, C flute, alto flute, piccolo, clarinet, Soprano saxophone, pennywhistle, ocarina
 Eric Segnitz – string arrangements
 Douglas Spotted Eagle – Native American flute on tracks 2, 6, 7, 13, and 15

References

1997 albums
David Arkenstone albums
Windham Hill Records albums